Pearà (Veronese dialect term, literally "peppered") is a traditional Veronese sauce made with bread crumbs, beef and hen stock, beef marrow and black pepper.
It is served exclusively together with bollito misto, making Lesso e pearà (lesso is Venetian for bollito), a typical dish unique to Verona and its surroundings. It should not be confused with pevarada, a sauce made with chicken livers, with which it only shares the use of pepper.

Ingredients and preparation
Preparation of pearà is closely linked to that of lesso, from whose stock it's made and whose meats it accompanies.
Stock is made by simmering beef, hen and herbs (carrot, onion and celery); the complete recipe also includes calf's head and oxtail.

Pearà requires a long, slow cooking; for its thermal properties, a traditional terracotta pot is to be preferred. 
First off the bread crumbs are mixed in the pot to the melted marrow and butter; afterwards scalding hot stock is added with a ladle while stirring continuously. The pot is then left to simmer for at least two hours, to obtain the desired creamy and thick texture. The sauce's namesake - abundant, freshly ground black pepper - is added towards the end of the cooking. Some recipes also add olive oil and grated Parmesan.

History 
The origin of this poor, peasant dish of Veronese cuisine is unknown. Legend has it that it was the court cook of Alboino, King of the Lombards, who invented it because he needed a food that would give strength back to Rosmunda. She had been forced to become the king's wife and was starving to death after having been obliged to drink from a cup made from the skull of her father Cunimondo, King of the Gepids, killed in battle by Alboino himself. The version of illustrious Veronese experts is that the origins of pearà are to be found in its simplicity and cheapness.

Recommended accompaniment 
Pearà is eaten after first course of broth, such as paparele, tortellini di Valeggio or gratini in broth, and is accompanied by boiled meat and bitter wild herbs tossed in the pan. This denotes that 'pearà' does not denote a mere dish, but a certain type of meal in its entirety. The typical cuts of boiled meat are tongue, chicken or whole capon. The presence of cotechino is probably a recent addition (it is not part of the broth preparation). The fact that it is traditionally served with boiled meat underlines how central the preparation of a good broth was.

The cheese dispute 
There are disagreements over whether or not to use cheese: on the one hand, one school of thought maintains that pearà is an essentially poor dish – made only with "leftovers" from other dishes, such as pieces of stale bread and ox marrow – and therefore, in “respect of its poverty,” Grana Padano cheese should not be added; but the fact that it is a poor man’s dish is in contradiction with the fact that it is accompanied exclusively by boiled meat (the family Sunday dish) and that its qualifying ingredient is pepper which, as an Oriental spice, was certainly not originally an ingredient for the poor. From the differences of opinion, it can be deduced that in the Veronese tradition, this is a dish which has always had a rich version (with cheese and lots of pepper) and a poor version (without cheese and with little pepper), whereby butter and cheese could be added in varying quantities to the leftovers mentioned above, such as stale bread and ox bone marrow. Even bread in Veneto was not exactly a food for the poor, as the staple food par excellence was polenta (see the matter of eating only polenta and the plague of pellagra in the Veneto and elsewhere) and therefore the availability even of stale bread was also linked to a higher-than-average state of wellbeing. The fact remains that in the relatively recent past, it was a common festive dish for a population of lower and middle income, since the wealthy population had a diet that was strongly influenced by French cuisine, then a point of reference for the wealthy and aristocratic, based on other foodstuffs and recipes. It can certainly be said that the widespread addition of cheese is therefore relatively recent.

References

Cuisine of Veneto
Italian sauces